Victor Stoloff (1913–2009) was a Russian Empire-born American Hollywood director, producer and screenplay writer who worked in film and television. In 1943, Stoloff and Edgar Loew were nominated for an Academy Award in the category "Best Documentary", for the film Little Isles of Freedom.

Selected filmography
 Fatal Symphony (1947) - director
Little Isles of Freedom (1943) - producer, director
Egypt By Three (1953) - director
She Gods of Shark Reef (1958) - screenplay writer
Desert Desperadoes (1959) - screenplay writer
Intimacy (1966) - writer, director
Why? (1971) - director
The Washington Affair (1977)

References

External links

Biography at HSJE

1913 births
2009 deaths
Soviet emigrants to the United States
American film directors
American film producers
American screenwriters
20th-century screenwriters